Brasovo is a rural locality (a selo) in Brasovsky District, Bryansk Oblast, Russia. The population was 1,363 as of 2018. There are 11 streets.

Geography 
Brasovo is located 4 km northeast of Lokot (the district's administrative centre) by road. Chistopolyansky and Lokot are the nearest rural localities.

References 

Rural localities in Brasovsky District
Sevsky Uyezd